Dolichopus remipes is a species of long-legged fly in the family Dolichopodidae. It is found in Europe.

References

remipes
Articles created by Qbugbot
Insects described in 1839
Taxa named by Peter Fredrik Wahlberg